The First Women's Basketball League of Serbia (abbr. ПЖЛС or PŽLS), is a top-tier women's professional basketball league in Serbia. Founded in 2006, it is run by the Basketball Federation of Serbia (KSS).

The league is divided into two parts. The first part of the play all the clubs who have won a place in it. In the second part, called the playoffs, they play eight first clubs from the first division. Play starts from the quarter-final of the series, where the winner is decided in two games, the same system is in the semifinals, while the final series game in three wins. Clubs from Serbia who play in the Adriatic league, play along with the domestic the League.

History

Champions

All–time national champions
Total number of national champions won by Serbian clubs. Table includes titles won during the Yugoslav Women's Basketball League (1945–1992) and the First Women's Basketball League of Serbia and Montenegro (1992–2006) as well.

See also
 Basketball Federation of Serbia
 Serbia women's national basketball team
 Milan Ciga Vasojević Cup

References

External links

Profile at eurobasket.com
Profile at srbijasport.net

 
Women's basketball competitions in Serbia
Serbia
Basketball leagues in Serbia
2006 establishments in Serbia
Sports leagues established in 2006
Professional sports leagues in Serbia